Channel Incident is a 1940 British short (15 minute) drama film directed by Anthony Asquith and starring Peggy Ashcroft, Gordon Harker, Robert Newton and Kenneth Griffith. It combines documentary footage with acting. It is placed on the ships SS Princess Louise, SS Blackburn Rovers and SS Devonia.

The film was a propaganda effort, made during the Second World War, which depicts the owner of a yacht heading across the Channel to help evacuate British troops from Dunkirk.

References

External links

1940 films
British black-and-white films
Films directed by Anthony Asquith
1940s war drama films
British World War II propaganda shorts
British war drama films
1940 drama films
1940s English-language films